Wymer is an unincorporated community in Randolph County, West Virginia, United States.

The community most likely derives its name from Weimar, in Germany.

References

Unincorporated communities in Randolph County, West Virginia
Unincorporated communities in West Virginia